Lord Charles Amelius Hervey (1 November 1814 – 11 April 1880) was the fifth son of Frederick Hervey, 1st Marquess of Bristol, an English clergyman and a first-class cricketer who played in a single match for Cambridge University. His place of birth is not known in cricket and other directories, but the 1871 census return indicates he was born in London; he died at Great Chesterford, Essex.

Cricket career
Hervey played in the 1835 match between Cambridge University and the Marylebone Cricket Club which has been recognised as first-class: he batted in the lower order and failed to score in either innings, and there is no record that he bowled or took a wicket, though the match scorecard is incomplete.

Career outside cricket
Hervey was educated at Eton College and Trinity College, Cambridge. On graduation, he was ordained as a Church of England priest and from 1839 to his death in 1880 he was the rector of Great and Little Chesterford, Essex.

References

1814 births
1880 deaths
English cricketers
Cambridge University cricketers
Charles
People educated at Eton College
Alumni of Trinity College, Cambridge
19th-century English Anglican priests
Younger sons of marquesses